Ahmed Nabil may refer to:

 Ahmed Nabil (fencer) (born 1986), Egyptian fencer
 Ahmed Nabil (footballer) (born 1991), Egyptian footballer